The {{nihongo|Momo-class destroyer'''|桃型駆逐艦|Momogata kuchikukan}} consisted of four destroyers built for the Imperial Japanese Navy during World War I. As with the previous , all were named after trees.

Background
The Momo-class destroyers were designed as part of the first phase of the Hachi-Hachi Kantai program of the Imperial Japanese Navy, at the same time as the large Isokaze class. However, the Japanese Navy could not afford to build many large destroyers, so it was decided to split production between large "1st-class destroyers" (i.e. the Isokaze class) and new medium-sized "2nd class destroyers" (i.e. the Momo class).

Four vessels were built under the fiscal 1915 budget, with the order split between Maizuru Naval Arsenal and Sasebo Naval Arsenal.

Design
The Momo-class ships were a scaled-down version of the Isokaze class and retained many of the innovations introduced by that class: curved, rather than straight bow, torpedo tubes, geared turbines, and a single-caliber main battery.

Internally, the engines were heavy fuel oil-fired steam turbine engines. Two vessels (Hinoki and Yanagi) used Brown-Curtis turbine engines, and the other two (Momo and Kashi) used Japanese-designed geared turbine engines.

Armament was slightly less than the Isokaze class, with three instead of four QF 4.7 inch Gun Mk I - IV guns, pedestal mounted along the centerline of the vessel, front, mid-ship and to the stern. The number of torpedoes was the same as the Isokaze (i.e. two triple launchers).

Operational history
The Momo-class destroyers were completed in time to serve in the very final stages of World War I. As the Japanese 15th Destroyer Flotilla under the cruiser , they were based at Malta from August 1917. The Japanese fleet was nominally independent, but carried out operations under the direction of the Royal Navy command on Malta, primarily in escort operations for transport and troopship convoys and in anti-submarine warfare operations against German U-boats in the Mediterranean.Kashi was transferred to the Manchukuo Imperial Navy on 1 May 1937 and was renamed Hai Wei. However, on 6 June 1942, Hai Wei was transferred back to the Imperial Japanese Navy, and reclassified as the auxiliary escort Kari. The ship fought in World War II, and was sunk by United States Navy aircraft from TF38 off of Okinawa on 10 October 1944.

The remaining three vessels were retired on 1 April 1940 and broken up, except for Yanagi, which was retained as a training hulk until 1947. Yanagis hull was eventually used as part of the breakwater at Kitakyushu alongside the Suzutsuki.

Ships

In film
In the 1958 World War II film Run Silent, Run Deep'', Clark Gable's character is obsessed with sinking what he refers to as an "Akikaze"-class destroyer. To test his radically aggressive head-on "down the throat" attack plan, he first engages one of the smaller "Momo"-class destroyers. His completely unconventional attack works and he sinks the destroyer.  Having proven the viability of his tactic, he then attacks a larger and far more dangerous destroyer that he calls an "Akikaze"-class destroyer. He believes it is the ship that claimed his previous submarine and four others. In reality, the destroyer "Akikaze" was one of 16 "Minekaze"-class destroyers. There was no "Akikaze" class, although it is referred to as if "Akikaze" were the name of the class throughout the movie. The actual "Minekaze" class, of which the real "Akikaze" was a member is never mentioned.

References

Notes

Books

External links

 

Destroyer classes